Ernest Harvey Pulford (April 22, 1875 – October 31, 1940) was a Canadian athlete at the turn of the twentieth century, winning national championships in ice hockey, lacrosse, football, boxing, paddling and rowing. A highly regarded defenceman with the Ottawa Hockey Club, where he was known for being a large and solid player who was excellent at checking opponents. With Ottawa he won the Stanley Cup four times, and also won championships or tournaments in every sport in which he played. When the Hockey Hall of Fame was founded in 1945, Pulford was one of the original nine inductees.

Personal life
Harvey Pulford was born in Toronto, Ontario on April 22, 1875. His parents, Ernest George and Minnie Pulford, were originally from England and had moved to Canada in 1874 with their infant son, Dennis. In 1878 the family moved to Ottawa, Ontario, as Ernest was hired by the Department of the Secretary of State. Pulford married Annis Mae Field of Brockville, Ontario; she died giving birth to a son, Harvey F. Pulford, on December 7, 1904. Pulford later married Jennie Davidson. In 1891 Pulford started working, first as a clerk with John M. Garland, a wholesale dry-goods firm, and later transferred into working as a salesman with the company. He later worked for the Imperial Life Assurance Company of Canada from 1921 until his death.

Pulford died October 31, 1940 and was buried in Ottawa's Beechwood Cemetery. Jennie, his widow lived until April 29, 1947, and is also buried at Beechwood. The younger Harvey Pulford became an employee of the Canadian Pacific Railway and eventually moved to Chicago.

Sports career

Pulford joined the Ottawa Hockey Club in 1893, playing as a defenceman. In his first season, Pulford played in the first Stanley Cup playoff games, against the Montreal Hockey Club. Pulford played for Ottawa until 1908, the year that Ottawa became professional. Pulford was captain of the Ottawa Hockey Club during the "Ottawa Silver Seven" era when the club won the Stanley Cup in March 1903 and held it until March 1906. After retirement from playing, Pulford continued in the game as a referee. In 1933, Pulford was given an option to buy the Ottawa club, by then known as the Senators, and move it to Baltimore, Maryland, but the purchase did not go through.

Pulford was outstanding in several sports. He was a backfielder for the Ottawa Football Club football team from 1893 to 1909, winning national championships in 1898, 1899, 1900, and 1902. He also served as captain of the team. He played lacrosse for the Ottawa Lacrosse Club from 1893 to 1900, winning four national titles. As a boxer, he won Eastern Canadian light heavyweight and heavyweight titles between 1896 and 1898.

He was hesitant to start the 1907 season as he wanted to row the following summer and was concerned about playing professionals on other hockey teams, which would not allow him to compete in other sports as the rules stated. Despite members of his rowing club telling him to stay out of hockey, Pulford wanted to play for the Stanley Cup and rejoined the Senators a few days before the season started.

Prior to the 1909 season Pulford decided to retire from hockey.

Throughout his career Pulford was renown as one of the best defencemen in hockey. While not a fast skater or skilled stickhandler, he was known as a big player and able to give solid checks. Hockey historian Charles Coleman noted that Pulford did not try to carry the puck up the ice until 1901, several years after the concept was introduced for defencemen, instead preferring to check opposing players and then shoot the puck to the other end of the ice (icing, which forbade this, would not be introduced for several decades). He was also known for his leadership of Ottawa, serving as captain for some time, and apparently was not happy to be replaced in that role in 1906.

Pulford was an excellent rower, Britannia Boating Club winning national and U.S. championships and leading his crew to the semifinals of the 1911 Henley Royal Regatta.

He was a member of the 1910 Ottawa Rowing Club eight that defeated every one of its opponents in 1910, earning the Canadian and North American championships. Pulford later became president of the Ottawa Rowing Club. He served as president of Ottawa Rowing Club until resigning in 1936.

Pulford resigned as a rower with the Ottawa Rowing Club.

In 1916, Pulford was a candidate to succeed Emmett Quinn as president of the National Hockey Association (NHA), though he lost to Frank Robinson. He was nominated by Eddie Livingstone to replace Frank Calder as president of the by-then defunct NHA in a league meeting on September 28, 1918, but Calder would retain his position.

Pulford remained active in sports later in life. In his late 40s, he won the Ottawa squash championship and held it from 1922 to 1924.

Pulford was a charter member of the Hockey Hall of Fame (1945) and the Ottawa Sports Hall of Fame (1966). He was, with Russell Bowie, Harry Westwick and Alf Smith, one of the final active hockey players who had played in the 19th century. He was also inducted into the Ontario Sports Hall of Fame in 2003 and into Canada's Sports Hall of Fame in 2015.

Career statistics

Regular season and playoffs

Source: Total Hockey

References

Notes

Citations

References

External links
 

1875 births
1940 deaths
Burials at Beechwood Cemetery (Ottawa)
Canadian ice hockey defencemen
Canadian ice hockey officials
Canadian male rowers
Canadian people of English descent
Hockey Hall of Fame inductees
Ice hockey people from Ontario
Ottawa Rough Riders players
Ottawa Senators (original) players
People from Old Toronto
Players of Canadian football from Ontario
Rowers from Ottawa
Rowers from Toronto
Stanley Cup champions